The icebreakers of Germany include one large icebreaker, used for International polar research and dozens of smaller icebreakers that clear navigation channels of ice in Germany's territorial waters.

See also
List of icebreakers

References